The popularity of the Japanese anime metaseries Gundam since its release in 1979 has resulted in a spread of merchandise across various forms, with video games among them. 
  
This is a list of video games that are set in the franchise's various timelines, and are segregated by the console systems they were released for.

By March 2004, the series had sold over  units.

Arcade

Gundam: Battle Simulator
Mobile Suit Gundam
Mobile Suit Gundam: Final Shooting
Mobile Suit Gundam: EX Revue
Mobile Suit Gundam: The Card Builder 
Mobile Suit Gundam: Bonds of the Battlefield
Mobile Suit Gundam: Spirits of Zeon - Dual Stars of Carnage
Mobile Suit Gundam: Spirits of Zeon - Memory of Soldier
 Mobile Suit Gundam VS Series
Mobile Suit Gundam: Federation vs. Zeon
Mobile Suit Gundam: Federation vs. Zeon DX
Mobile Suit Z Gundam: A.E.U.G. vs. Titans
Mobile Suit Z Gundam: A.E.U.G. vs. Titans DX
Gundam Seed: Rengou vs. Z.A.F.T.
Mobile Suit Gundam Seed Destiny: Rengou vs. Z.A.F.T. II
Mobile Suit Gundam: Gundam vs. Gundam
Mobile Suit Gundam: Gundam vs. Gundam Next
Mobile Suit Gundam: Extreme Vs.
Mobile Suit Gundam: Extreme Vs. Full Boost
Mobile Suit Gundam: Extreme Vs. Maxi Boost
Mobile Suit Gundam: Extreme Vs. Maxi Boost ON
Mobile Suit Gundam: Extreme Vs. 2 
Mobile Suit Gundam: Extreme Vs. 2 XBoost 
Quiz Mobile Suit Gundam: Monsenshi 
 Gundam P.O.D. Series
Kidō Senshi Gundam: Senjō no Kizuna
Mobile Suit Survival Game

Fujitsu

FM-7
Kidou Senshi Gundam Part 1: Gundam Daishi ni Tatsu
Kidou Senshi Gundam Part 2: Tobe Gundam

FM Towns
Mobile Suit Gundam: Hyper Classic Operation
Mobile Suit Gundam: Hyper Desert Operation

MSX
Mobile Suit Gundam: Last Shooting
MS Field: Kidou Senshi Gundam
MS Field Kidou Senshi Gundam Plus Kit
MS Field Kidou Senshi Gundam Plus Kit Tsuki

NEC

PC-88
Kidou Senshi Gundam Part 1: Gundam Daishi ni Tatsu
Kidou Senshi Gundam Part 2: Tobe Gundam

PC-98
Kidou Senshi Gundam Part 1: Gundam Daishi ni Tatsu
Mobile Suit Gundam: Return of Zeon
Mobile Suit Gundam: A Year of War
Mobile Suit Gundam: Advanced Operation
Mobile Suit Gundam: Multiple Operation
Mobile Suit Gundam 0083: Stardust Operation
MS Field: Mobile Suit Gundam
MS Field 2 '92: Mobile Suit Gundam

Sharp

Sharp X1
Kidou Senshi Gundam Part 1: Gundam Daishi ni Tatsu
Kidou Senshi Gundam Part 2: Tobe Gundam

Sharp X68000
Mobile Suit Gundam: Classic Operation
Mobile Suit Gundam: Classic Operation - Original Scenario Disk

PC
Gundam Evolution
Gundam Network Operation
Gundam Network Operation 2
Gundam Network Operation 3
Gundam Storm (Browser-Based) - Service terminated
Mobile Suit Gundam 0079: The War For Earth - 1996 interactive movie collaboration between Bandai and Presto Studios Inc. Also released for Macintosh, PlayStation (JP release only) and Pippin. 
Mobile Suit Gundam Battle Operation 2
Mobile Suit Gundam Online
New Gundam Breaker
SD Gundam Capsule Fighter Online
SD Gundam G Generation Cross Rays
Universal Century Gundam Online
SD Gundam Battle Alliance

Bandai

Arcadia

Mobile Suit Gundam

Bandai RX-78

Gundam - Luna II no Tatakai

Playdia

SD Gundam Daizukan

Apple Bandai Pippin
Gundam Tactics Mobility Fleet 0079

WonderSwan

Mobile Suit Gundam: MSVS
SD Gundam G Generation: Gather Beat
SD Gundam: Emotional Jam

WonderSwan Color

SD Gundam G Generation: Gather Beat 2
SD Gundam G Generation: Monoeye Gundams
Mobile Suit Gundam SEED
Gundam Strike Force Go !!!: Stairway to the Destined Victory: Worldwide Edition
Mobile Suit Gundam: Operation U.C.

Nintendo

Family Computer

Mobile Suit Z Gundam: Hot Scramble
SD Gundam Gaiden: Knight Gundam Monogatari
SD Gundam Gaiden: Knight Gundam Monogatari 2
SD Gundam Gaiden: Knight Gundam Monogatari 3
SD Gundam World Gachapon Senshi - Scramble Wars
SD Gundam World Gachapon Senshi 2 - Capsule Senki
SD Gundam World Gachapon Senshi 3 - Eiyû Senki
SD Gundam World Gachapon Senshi 4 - New Type Story
SD Gundam World Gachapon Senshi 5 - Battle of Universal Century
SD Gundam: Gundam Wars

Super Famicom

Mobile Suit Gundam: Cross Dimension 0079 - Tactical role-playing game
Mobile Suit Zeta Gundam: Away to the Newtype - Tactical role-playing game
Mobile Suit Gundam F91: Formula Wars 0122
Mobile Suit Victory Gundam - 2D fighting game
Mobile Fighter G Gundam - 2D fighting game
Shin Kidō Senki Gundam Wing: Endless Duel - 2D fighting game
SD Gundam: G Next - Turn-based strategy
SD Gundam: GX - Turn-based strategy
SD Gundam Gaiden: Knight Gundam Monogatari - Ooinaru Isan - Japanese role playing game
SD Gundam Gaiden 2: Entaku no Kishi - Japanese role playing game
SD Gundam Generation - Tactical role-playing game
SD Gundam: Power Formation Puzzle - Puzzle games
SD Gundam: V Sakusen Shidō - Shoot 'em up with Run and gun stages
SD Gundam 2 - Shoot 'em up with Run and gun stages
Super Gachapon World: SD Gundam X - Turn-based strategy
SD the Great Battle - top-down platforming shoot 'em up, part of the Compati Hero series also featuring Ultraman and Kamen Rider characters
Battle Soccer: Field no Hasha - Soccer game, part of the Compati Hero series also featuring Ultraman and Kamen Rider characters, this game also features Godzilla characters
Battle Racers - kart racer, part of the Compati Hero series also featuring Ultraman and Kamen Rider characters

GameCube

Mobile Suit Gundam: The Ace Pilot
Mobile Suit Gundam: Gundam vs. Zeta Gundam (Only in Japan)
SD Gundam Gashapon Wars

Wii

Mobile Suit Gundam: MS Sensen 0079
SD Gundam G Generation Wars
SD Gundam G Generation World
SD Gundam: Scad Hammers
SD Gundam Gashapon Wars

Nintendo Switch

SD Gundam G Generation Genesis
SD Gundam G Generation Cross Rays
SD Gundam Battle Alliance

Game Boy

SD Gundam G-Arms
SD Gundam Gaiden: Lacroan Heroes
SD Gundam: SD Sengokuden - Kuni Nusiri Monogatari
SD Gundam: SD Sengokuden 2 - Tenka Touitsuhen
SD Gundam: SD Sengokuden 3 - Chijou Saikyouhen'''Shin SD Gundam GaidenVirtual BoySD Gundam Dimension WarGame Boy AdvanceSD Gundam G Generation AdvanceMobile Suit Gundam SEED: Tomo to Kimi to koko deMobile Suit Gundam SEED: DestinyMobile Suit Gundam SEED: Battle AssaultSD Gundam ForceNintendo DSSD Gundam G Generation DSSD Gundam G Generation: Cross DriveMobile Suit Gundam 00Emblem of GundamSD Gundam Sangokuden DSNintendo 3DSSD Gundam G Generation 3DGundam the 3D BattleGundam Try Age SPSony

PlayStationMobile Suit Gundam (1995)Mobile Suit Gundam v.2.0 (1996)Mobile Suit Gundam 0079: The War For Earth (1997)Gundam: Battle AssaultGundam: Battle Assault 2Kidou Butouden G GundamMobile Suit Gundam: Char's Counterattack (1998)Mobile Suit Gundam: Giren's Greed, Blood of ZeonMobile Suit Gundam: Perfect One Year WarSD Gundam G CenturySD Gundam G GenerationSD Gundam G Generation ZeroSD Gundam G Generation FSD Gundam G Generation F-IFMobile Suit Z-GundamPlayStation 2Mobile Suit Gundam: Gihren's AmbitionGiren no Yabou: Zeon Dokuritsu Sensouden - Kouryaku ShireishoMobile Suit Gundam: Journey to JaburoMobile Suit Gundam: Zeonic FrontMobile Suit Gundam: Lost War ChroniclesMobile Suit Gundam: Encounters in SpaceMobile Suit Gundam: The One Year WarMobile Suit Gundam: Climax U.C.SD Gundam G Generation NeoSD Gundam G Generation SEEDSD Gundam G Generation SpiritsSD Gundam G Generation WarsMobile Suit Gundam SEEDMobile Suit Gundam SEED: Never Ending TomorrowMobile Suit Gundam SEED Destiny: Generation of C.E.Battle Assault 3 Featuring Gundam SEEDMobile Suit Gundam: Federation vs. ZeonMobile Suit Gundam Z: AEUG vs. TitansMobile Suit Gundam: Gundam vs. Zeta GundamGundam Seed: Rengou vs. Z.A.F.T.Mobile Suit Gundam Seed Destiny: Rengou vs. Z.A.F.T. IIMobile Suit Gundam 00: Gundam MeistersMS Saga: A New DawnG-SaviourSD Gundam Force: Showdown!Dynasty Warriors: GundamDynasty Warriors: Gundam 2PlayStation 3Mobile Suit Gundam: Crossfire (a.k.a. Mobile Suit Gundam: Target in Sight)Mobile Suit Gundam Battlefield Record U.C. 0081Mobile Suit Gundam: Side Stories - combines six games released for Sega Saturn, Dreamcast and PlayStation 2, and includes new campaign that connects all releases together with Gundam UnicornMobile Suit Gundam UnicornDynasty Warriors: GundamDynasty Warriors: Gundam 2Dynasty Warriors: Gundam 3Dynasty Warriors Gundam RebornMobile Suit Gundam: Extreme Vs.Mobile Suit Gundam: Extreme Vs. Full BoostMobile Suit Gundam Extreme Vs. Full Boost Premium G SoundGundam BreakerGundam Breaker 2Gundam Battle OperationGundam Battle Operation NextSuper Hero Generation -  tactical role-playing game, part of the Compati Hero series also featuring Ultraman and Kamen Rider characters

PlayStation 4SD Gundam G Generation GenesisSD Gundam G Generation Cross RaysGundam Breaker 3New Gundam BreakerGundam VersusGundam Battle Operation Next (no physical release)Mobile Suit Gundam: Battle Operation 2 (no physical release)Mobile Suit Gundam Extreme VS. Maxiboost OnMobile Suit Gundam Battle Operation Code Fairy (no physical release)SD Gundam Battle Alliance (no physical release)Gundam Evolution (no physical release)

PlayStation 5Mobile Suit Gundam Battle Operation Code FairySD Gundam Battle AllianceGundam EvolutionPlayStation PortableGundam Battle TacticsGundam Battle RoyaleGundam Battle ChronicleGundam Battle UniverseGundam Assault SurviveSD Gundam G Generation PortableSD Gundam G Generation WorldSD Gundam G Generation OverworldMobile Suit Gundam: Giren no Yabou - Axis no KyouiMobile Suit Gundam: Gundam vs. GundamMobile Suit Gundam: Gundam vs. Gundam NEXT PLUSMobile Suit Gundam SEED: Federation vs. Z.A.F.T. PortableMobile Suit Gundam: Senjou no Kizuna PortableMobile Suit Gundam: Mokuba no Kiseki Gundam Memories: Tatakai no KiokuMobile Suit Gundam AGE: Universe AccelMobile Suit Gundam AGE: Cosmic DriveGreat Battle Fullblast - Beat'em up, part of the Compati Hero series also featuring Ultraman and Kamen Rider characters

PlayStation VitaSD Gundam G Generation GenesisKidō Senshi Gundam SEED Battle DestinyGundam BreakerGundam Breaker 2Gundam Breaker 3Mobile Suit Gundam Extreme Vs ForceMobile Suit Gundam: Battle FortressGundam Conquest VDynasty Warriors Gundam Reborn3rd Super Robot Wars Z ZigokuhenSuper Hero Generation -  tactical role-playing game, part of the Compati Hero series also featuring Ultraman and Kamen Rider characters

Sega
Game GearSD Gundam: Winner's HistorySega SaturnMobile Suit GundamMobile Suit Z Gundam: KouhenMobile Suit Z Gundam: ZenpenMobile Suit Gundam: Gihren's GreedMobile Suit Gundam Side Story: The Blue Destiny Vol. 1Mobile Suit Gundam Side Story: The Blue Destiny Vol. 2Mobile Suit Gundam Side Story: The Blue Destiny Vol. 3SD Gundam G Century SDreamcastGundam Side Story 0079: Rise from the AshesMobile Suit Gundam Gihren's Greed - Blood of ZeonMobile Suit Gundam: Federation Vs. Zeon DXGundam Battle OnlineMicrosoft

Xbox 360Mobile Ops: The One Year WarDynasty Warriors: GundamDynasty Warriors: Gundam 2Dynasty Warriors: Gundam 3Xbox OneSD Gundam Battle AllianceGundam EvolutionXbox Series X/SSD Gundam Battle AllianceGundam Evolution''

References

 
Gundam (video game series)
 
Gundam
Gundam